The Annals of the Botanical Garden of Madrid (abbreviation Anales Jard. Bot. Madrid) is a Spanish publication specialized in botany.

See also
 Real Jardín Botánico de Madrid
 Open access in Spain

References

External links
IPNI

Botany journals
Publications established in 1941
1941 establishments in Spain
Spanish-language magazines